Sha Tin station, formerly known as Sha Tin railway station ( or ) is a station on the  of Hong Kong's Mass Transit Railway (MTR) system. The station is located in the town centre of Sha Tin.

The station was formerly on the main line of the Kowloon–Canton Railway (KCR), but since KCR's merger with the MTR, it belongs to the East Rail line of the MTR.

Citylink Plaza, which has a footbridge link to New Town Plaza, is built on top of the station. The station serves two large bus termini with buses going to many places around Hong Kong (such as Sai Kung or Tung Chung). One is on an elevated surface, adjacent to the concourse level. The other is at ground level in New Town Plaza.

History
The station originally opened on 1 October 1910. The railway was single-track at that time, but Sha Tin station had a passing loop. The station office was housed in a single-storey stone building.

Sha Tin station was rebuilt in the early 1980s in preparation for the railway's electrification. On 6 May 1982, Sir Philip Haddon-Cave unveiled a plaque in the concourse of Sha Tin station to open the first phase of electric service, which spanned from Hung Hom to Shatin initially. At the same time, daily service hours to Sha Tin were extended from 10:30 pm to midnight. Electric service was extended to Tai Po on 2 May 1983, and to Lo Wu (the full length of the KCR British Section) on 15 July 1983. The new station initially had a branch of Hang Seng Bank, for people with need of coin exchange and banking services.

The Citylink Plaza, an HK$82 million building that originally housed the headquarters of the KCR Corporation as well as many government offices, was built on top of the station and opened in 1983.

The station concourse was substantially renovated from 2010 to 2013.

Layout 

There are two island platforms for platforms 1 and 2, and platforms 3 and 4 respectively.

Trains normally stop at platforms 2 and 3. Platforms 1 and 4 are used in the following occasions:
for special departures during peak hours (platform 4 for southbound) and race days (platform 1 for northbound),
to serve as buffers when the train frequency is high during peak hours, or
to allow non-stop trains to overtake local trains.
This station's layout is similar to Tai Po Market station

Gallery

Exits 
A1: Pai Tau Street, public transport interchange 
A2: Citylink Plaza 
A3: New Town Plaza 
A4: Pai Tau Village
B: Pai Tau Street, Pai Tau Village, public transport interchange

References 

MTR stations in the New Territories
East Rail line
Sha Tin
Former Kowloon–Canton Railway stations
Railway stations in Hong Kong opened in 1910